"N.D.C." is a song by Australian alternative rock band Jebediah. It was released in July 2002 as the third and final single from the band's self-titled album, Jebediah. The track was co-written by the group's members, Chris Daymond (lead guitar), Brett Mitchell (drums, backing vocals), his brother Kevin Mitchell (lead vocals, rhythm guitar) and Vanessa Thornton (bass guitar). It was released in July 2002 and peaked at number 92 on the ARIA Singles Chart.

Song meaning

During an interview following a live performance at Fox Studios in Sydney, Australia, the band revealed that the song title is ambiguous, and could be a pun on the phrase, "indie scene", or an acronym for "No Definite Conclusion".

Track listing

Charts

References

2002 singles
Jebediah songs
2001 songs
Songs written by Kevin Mitchell (musician)
Song recordings produced by Magoo (Australian producer)